Michael Konik is an American author, television personality, jazz singer, improvisational comedian, blackjack player and poker player. Konik has a degree in Drama from New York University.

Konik currently resides in Hollywood, California with his wife Charmaine Clamor, and his dog Billie.

Writing
Michael Konik is the author of the following books:
The Man with the $100,000 Breasts and other Gambling Stories (1999)
Nice Shot, Mr. Nicklaus: Stories About the Game of Golf (2000) Huntington Press, 
Telling Lies and Getting Paid (2002) Huntington Press, 
In Search of Burningbush: A Story of Golf, Friendship, and the Meaning of Irons (2004) McGraw-Hill, 
Ella in Europe: An American Dog’s International Adventure (2005) Random House Publishing Group, 
The Smart Money (2006) Simon & Schuster, 
Reefer Gladness (2010) Huntington Press, 
Becoming Bobby (2012) Huntington Press 
Making It (2014)
The Termite Squad (2016) Eggypress 0-995952-72-8
How the Revolution Started (2017) Eggypress 0-995952-71-0
Konik was also the gambling columnist for Cigar Aficionado for five years, the golf columnist for Delta SKY for 10 years, and has been published in more than 100 other magazines, including Travel and Leisure, Maxim, and Sports Illustrated.

Television

Michael Konik was a contestant on NBC's 2007 "Poker After Dark," a $20,000 buy-in competition in which he finished 5th. He also competed in two of the televised World Series of Blackjack programs, advancing to the semi-finals. He has also either hosted or provided commentary for the following shows:
Poker Superstars
Poker Dome Challenge
Aussie Millions
Championship at the Plaza
American Poker Championship at Turning Stone
Full Tilt Pro Poker Showdown
Monte Carlo Millions
Asia-Pacific Speed Poker Championship
Poker Championship at Red Rock

Konik was a contestant on Jeopardy!, where he finished 2nd, the USA Network game show Quicksilver, where he set the one-day all-time record, and was a "phone-a-friend" lifeline on Who Wants to Be a Millionaire. Konik was also a contestant two episodes of Greed. He competed in the December 9, 1999 episode, winning $5,000 as the Captain.  On February 29, 2000, he was on another episode, but failed to win any money.

In 2006, Konik played himself in the Animal Planet comedy Ella & Me, based on his book Ella in Europe. His dog Ella, a lab-greyhound mix, co-starred.

Music

Konik was a singer and bass player for the 1980s punk rock band The Clitboys.  He has recorded the jazz albums Crescendo and There'll Be Some Changes Made, both released in 2003: Konik and his "Tasty Band" host the longest-running weekly jazz event in Hollywood, the "Tasty Tuesday Night Jazz Party," at Catalina Bar & Grill Jazz Club.  Konik owns a recording company called FreeHam Records, which includes Linda Hopkins and the Filipina jazz star Charmaine Clamor.

Comedy
Konik was a member of the improvisational comedy troupe The Los Hombres and MINT (Musical Improv Network Television), which performed at Second City Los Angeles.  Konik's most popular recurring character was a bread salesman who repeated the word "papadum" over and over throughout an entire scene.

Blackjack and poker

Konik has participated in the World Series of Blackjack, the Legends of Poker Tour, the World Series of Poker and Poker After Dark.

References

External links
Official site
Blackjack Hero profile
Hendon Mob tournament results

American gambling writers
American male non-fiction writers
American poker players
American blackjack players
Living people
Poker commentators
Year of birth missing (living people)
Tisch School of the Arts alumni